Angela is a 1955 American-Italian film noir, written and directed by Dennis O'Keefe, who stars in the film as well. The drama also features Mara Lane, Rossano Brazzi, Arnoldo Foà and others. The film has a voice-over narration that tells the story in flashback, and the film noir type of Angela has been described as femme fatale with elements of betrayal and obsession.

Plot
O’Keefe (Steve Catlett) stars as an American G.I. who remained in Italy after the war to manage a car dealership. He falls in love with a secretary (Mara Lane), and after only one date with her, she asks him to dispose of her boss’ body, who has died of a heart attack in her apartment. O'Keefe places the body in the trunk of the wrong car and watches helplessly as Lane drives away with it. O’Keefe then goes about trying to fix the situation, but a police inspector (Arnoldo Foà) and Lane’s sadistic husband (Rossano Brazzi) have ulterior motives in store for him.

Cast
Dennis O'Keefe - Steve Catlett 
Mara Lane - Angela Towne 
Rossano Brazzi - Nino
Arnoldo Foà - Captain Ambrosi
Galeazzo Benti - Gustavo Venturi
Enzo Fiermonte - Sergeant Collins
Nino Crisman - Bertolati
Giovanni Fostini - Tony
Francesco Tensi - Dr. Robini
Maria Teresa Paliani - Beautician
Gorella Gori - Nurse
Aldo Pini - Doorkeeper

Reviews and reception
A review in The New York Times was critical of the film, stating that "Mr. O'Keefe has himself a near-dud" and "the camera seems to be waiting for the picture to catch up with it". However, the reviewer praises the performance of Arnoldo Foà as being "ahead of it" [the camera]. Hal Erickson reviewed the film for AllMovie and opined that it "lacks the pacing and punch necessary to sustain audience empathy", but O'Keefe still "knows how to frame a scene and get the most out of his largely unknown cast". The Internet Movie Database rates the film a 5.4/10, based on user reviews. Michael Keaney wrote in his book, Film noir guide, that "O’Keefe is okay as the American patsy, as is Italian romantic lead Brazzi as Lane’s sadistic husband, but the all-too-familiar plot doesn’t make the grade".

See also
List of American films of 1955
List of film noir titles

References

External links

Color film noir
1955 films
1955 drama films
American drama films
Italian drama films
English-language Italian films
Films scored by Mario Nascimbene
20th Century Fox films
1950s American films
American black-and-white films
1950s Italian films